Farquhar MacDonald (30 September 1866 – 7 April 1919) was a New Zealand cricketer. He played in four first-class matches for Canterbury from 1889 to 1897.

See also
 List of Canterbury representative cricketers

References

External links
 

1866 births
1919 deaths
New Zealand cricketers
Canterbury cricketers
People from Geraldine, New Zealand
Cricketers from Canterbury, New Zealand